The 1964–65 Chicago Black Hawks season was the Hawks' 39th season in the NHL, and the club was coming off a second-place finish in 1963–64, as Chicago won a team record 36 games and also set a club record with 84 points.  The Hawks would defeat the Detroit Red Wings in 7 games in the NHL semi finals, but would fall to the Montreal Canadiens in the Stanley Cup Final in another hard fought 7-game series.

Offseason
The Hawks also made a few key signings, as they signed Dennis Hull, the younger brother of Bobby Hull, along with young defenseman Doug Jarrett.

Regular season
Chicago started the season off slowly, as they opened the year with a record of 8–11–2 in their opening 21 games, however, the Hawks broke out of their slump, and went on a 13-game unbeaten streak.  Bobby Hull was scoring in bunches, as he had 25 goals in his first 26 games.  Chicago stayed hot, as they would reach a high point of 12 games over .500 when their record was 32–20–7, however, the Hawks limped into the playoffs, going 2–8–1 in their last 11 games, as they finished the year with a 34–28–8 record, earning 76 points, which was their lowest point total since 1961–62.

Offensively, the Hawks were led by Stan Mikita, who won his second consecutive Art Ross Trophy, as he led the league with 87 points, as he scored 28 goals and added 59 assists.  Bobby Hull, who got off to that hot start, suffered an injury in early February, as he ended up missing nine games, and finished the season with 39 goals and 71 points.  Hull ended up winning the Hart Memorial Trophy, which is awarded to the MVP of the NHL.  Phil Esposito, in his second season in the NHL, broke out with 23 goals and 55 points, while Kenny Wharram had another solid season, scoring 24 goals and 44 points.  On the blueline, Pierre Pilote once again led the way, scoring 14 goals and 59 points, while registering a team high 162 penalty minutes, and a third consecutive Norris Trophy.

In goal, Glenn Hall had his playing time cut back, as he appeared in 41 games, winning a club high 18 games, while posting a team best 2.43 GAA, and 4 shutouts.  Backup goaltender Denis DeJordy played in 30 games, winning 16, while posting a 2.52 GAA, and earning 3 shutouts.

Season standings

Record vs. opponents

Game log

Playoffs
The Hawks would face the Detroit Red Wings in the NHL semi-finals for the third consecutive season, as Detroit finished first in the NHL with a record of 40–23–7, earning 87 points, which was 11 more than the third place Black Hawks.  The series opened up at the Detroit Olympia, and the Red Wings took control of the series, winning the opening two games by scores 4–3 and 6–3.  The series shifted to Chicago Stadium for the next two games, and the Black Hawks took advantage of their home ice, winning both games by scores of 5–2 and 2–1 to even the series up.  The fifth game was played in Detroit, and the Red Wings won the game 4–2, and took a 3–2 series lead.  Game six was in Chicago, and again, the home team won the game, as Chicago shutout the Red Wings 4–0, setting up a seventh game at the Olympia.  The Black Hawks skated into Detroit, and completed the upset, as Chicago doubled the Wings 4–2, and advanced to the Stanley Cup final for the first time since 1962.

Chicago's opponent in the 1965 Stanley Cup Finals was the Montreal Canadiens, who finished second in the league with a record of 36–23–11, earning 83 points, which was seven more than the Hawks.  The Canadiens defeated the Toronto Maple Leafs in the NHL semi-finals to earn a spot in the Stanley Cup final.  The series opened at the Montreal Forum for the opening two games, and the Canadiens quickly opened up a 2–0 series lead, with wins of 3–2 and 2–0.  The series moved to Chicago for the next two games, and the Black Hawks once again took advantage of their home ice, evening the series up with 3–1 and 5–1 victories.  Montreal was the site of the fifth game, and the Canadiens once again took the series lead, shutting out Chicago 6–0.  The sixth game was in Chicago, and the Black Hawks stayed red hot on home ice, defeating Montreal 2–1, and finished the playoffs with a 6–0 record at home.  However, the seventh and final game of the series was in Montreal, and the Black Hawks road woes continued, as the Canadiens shut out Chicago 4–0, to win the Stanley Cup.

Chicago Black Hawks 4, Detroit Red Wings 3

Montreal Canadiens 4, Chicago Black Hawks 3

Player stats

Regular season
Scoring

Goaltending

Playoff stats
Scoring leaders

Goaltending

Draft picks
Chicago's draft picks at the 1964 NHL Entry Draft held at the Queen Elizabeth Hotel in Montreal, Quebec.

References

Sources
Hockey-Reference
Rauzulu's Street
Goalies Archive
HockeyDB
National Hockey League Guide & Record Book 2007

Chicago Blackhawks seasons
Chicago
Chicago